The year 2011 is the 13th year in the history of King of the Cage, a mixed martial arts promotion based in the United States. In 2011 King of the Cage held 39 events, KOTC: Confrontation.

Title fights

Events list

KOTC: Confrontation

KOTC: Confrontation was an event held on January 15, 2011 at the Buffalo Thunder Resort & Casino in Santa Fe, New Mexico.

Results

KOTC: Underground 65

KOTC: Underground 65 was an event held on January 22, 2011 at the Ute Mountain Casino in Towaoc, Colorado.

Results

KOTC: Empire

KOTC: Empire was an event held on February 3, 2011 at the San Manuel Casino in San Bernardino, California.

Results

KOTC: Northern Meltdown

KOTC: Northern Meltdown was an event held on February 19, 2011 at the Northern Lights Casino in Walker, Minnesota.

Results

KOTC: Future Legends

KOTC: Future Legends was an event held on March 5, 2011 at the Eastside Cannery Casino and Hotel in Las Vegas, Nevada.

Results

KOTC: Turning Point

KOTC: Turning Point was an event held on March 27, 2011 at the Braemar Country Club in Tarzana, California.

Results

KOTC: Underground 66

KOTC: Underground 66 was an event held on April 2, 2011 at the Kewadin Casino in Sault Ste Marie, Michigan.

Results

KOTC: Underground 67

KOTC: Underground 67 was an event held on April 2, 2011 at the Ute Mountain Casino in Cortez, Colorado.

Results

KOTC: Outkasts

KOTC: Outkasts was an event held on April 9, 2011 at the Lake of the Torches Casino in Lac Du Flambeau, Wisconsin.

Results

KOTC: Texas

KOTC: Texas was an event held on April 16, 2011 in Lubbock, Texas, notable for Dan Severn securing his 100th professional win.

Results

KOTC: Underground 68

KOTC: Underground 68 was an event held on April 16, 2011 at the Leelanau Sands Casino in Peshawbestown, Michigan.

Results

KOTC: Moral Victory

KOTC: Moral Victory was an event held on April 21, 2011 at the San Manuel Casino in San Bernardino, California.

Results

KOTC: Fight to Live

KOTC: Fight to Live was an event held on May 14, 2011 at the San Manuel Casino in San Bernardino, California.

Results

KOTC: Future Legends 2

KOTC: Future Legends 2 was an event held on June 4, 2011 at the Eastside Cannery Casino and Hotel in Las Vegas, Nevada.

Results

KOTC: Epic Force

KOTC: Epic Force was an event held on June 24, 2011 at the Winstar Casino in Thackerville, Oklahoma.

Results

KOTC: D-Day

KOTC: D-Day was an event held on June 25, 2011 at the Royal Oak Music Theatre in Royal Oak, Michigan, United States.

Results

KOTC: Next Generation

KOTC: Next Generation was an event held on June 30, 2011 at the San Manuel Casino in Highland, California.

Results

KOTC: High Altitude

KOTC: High Altitude was an event held on July 16, 2011 at the Ute Mountain Casino in Highland, California.

Results

KOTC: Underground 69

KOTC: Underground 69 was an event held on July 16, 2011 at the Dream Makers Theater in Sault Ste. Marie, Michigan.

Results

KOTC: Shockwave

KOTC: Shockwave was an event held on July 23, 2011 at the Gold County Casino in Oroville, California.

Results

KOTC: Compression Test

KOTC: Compression Test was an event held on July 23, 2011 at the Lake of the Torches Resort & Casino in Lac du Flambeau, Wisconsin.

Results

KOTC: Demolition

KOTC: Demolition was an event held on August 6, 2011 at the Northern Lights Casino in Walker, Minnesota.

Results

KOTC: Overdrive

KOTC: Overdrive was an event held on August 20, 2011 at the Riverwind Casino in Norman, Oklahoma.

Results

KOTC: Kingpin

KOTC: Kingpin was an event held on August 27, 2011 at the Lubbock Memorial Civic Center in Lubbock, Texas.

Results

KOTC: Underground 70

KOTC: Underground 70 was an event held on August 27, 2011 at the Leelanau Sands Casino in Peshawbestown, Michigan.

Results

KOTC: Future Legends 3

KOTC: Future Legends 3 was an event held on September 3, 2011 at the Eastside Cannery Casino in Las Vegas, Nevada.

Results

KOTC: Rising Sun

KOTC: Rising Sun was an event held on September 10, 2011 at the Buffalo Thunder Resort & Casino in Santa Fe, New Mexico.

Results

KOTC: First Defense

KOTC: First Defense was an event held on September 15, 2011 at the San Manuel Casino in Highland, California.

Results

KOTC: Apocalypse

KOTC: Apocalypse was an event held on September 17, 2011 at the WinStar World Casino in Thackerville, Oklahoma.

Results

KOTC: Homecoming

KOTC: Homecoming was an event held on September 24, 2011 at the Soaring Eagle Casino in Mt. Pleasant, Michigan.

Results

KOTC: Interference

KOTC: Interference was an event held on October 8, 2011 at the Lake of the Torches Casino in Lac du Flambeau, Wisconsin.

Results

KOTC: Underground 71

KOTC: Underground 71 was an event held on October 15, 2011 at the Ute Mountain Casino in Cortez, Colorado.

Results

KOTC: Underground 72

KOTC: Underground 72 was an event held on November 12, 2011 at the Kewadin Casino in Sault Ste. Marie, Michigan.

Results

KOTC: Cage Quest

KOTC: Cage Quest was an event held on November 12, 2011 at the Gold Country Casino in Oroville, California.

Results

KOTC: High Performance

KOTC: High Performance was an event held on November 19, 2011 at the Buffalo Thunder Resort & Casino in Santa Fe, New Mexico.

Results

KOTC: Winter Warriors

KOTC: Winter Warriors was an event held on December 10, 2011 at the Northern Lights Casino in Walker, Minnesota.

Results

KOTC: Future Legends 4

KOTC: Future Legends 4 was an event held on December 10, 2011 at the Eastside Cannery Casino in Las Vegas, Nevada.

Results

KOTC: Magnaflow

KOTC: Magnaflow was an event held on December 15, 2011 at the San Manuel Casino in Highland, California.

Results

KOTC: Steel Curtain

KOTC: Steel Curtain was an event held on December 17, 2011 at the Riverwind Casino in Norman, Oklahoma.

Results

See also 
 King of the Cage
 List of King of the Cage events
 List of King of the Cage champions

References

King of the Cage events
2011 in mixed martial arts